Philippe Souchard (born 23 December 1979) is a French footballer, currently playing for French non-league team Niort Saint-Florent as a defender. He previously played 27 matches in Ligue 2 with Chamois Niortais.

See also
Football in France
List of football clubs in France

References

External links
Philippe Souchard profile at chamoisfc79.fr

1979 births
Living people
French footballers
Association football forwards
Chamois Niortais F.C. players
Ligue 2 players
SO Romorantin players
US Raon-l'Étape players
Angoulême Charente FC players
Association football defenders